Nuno Alexandre Carvalho Campos (born 20 April 1975) is a Portuguese former footballer who played as a midfielder, and a current manager.

Playing career
Born in Lisbon, Campos spent several youth years at C.F. Os Belenenses, but began his senior playing career in the third tier before signing for top-flight S.C. Campomaiorense in 1997. He was part of their squad that lost the 1999 Taça de Portugal Final 1–0 to S.C. Beira-Mar.

Coaching career

Santa Clara
Campos retired in 2005 and took up coaching in 2011. He began as assistant manager to Paulo Fonseca in several countries. He was appointed manager of C.D. Santa Clara on 7 October 2021, replacing Daniel Ramos at the helm for the rest of the season. He made his debut nine days later in a 2–0 win at U.D. Leiria in the third round of the Taça de Portugal. On 23 October, he lost 2–0 at home to F.C. Famalicão in his first league game. 

On 15 December 2021, Campos was dismissed. He had won one and drawn one of his six league game, and the team were in 16th.

Tondela
Campos returned to work in the top flight on 16 March 2022, succeeding Pako Ayestarán at 16th-placed C.D. Tondela. On his debut three days later, the team drew 2–2 at home to F.C. Arouca. On the final day of the season, the team from the Beira conceded two equalisers in a 2–2 draw with Boavista F.C. also at the Estádio João Cardoso, allowing Moreirense F.C. to rise above them outside the relegation zone.

In the 2021–22 Taça de Portugal, Campos led Tondela to their first cup final with a 4–1 aggregate win over C.D. Mafra, though the three goals of the first leg were under his predecessor. There, they lost 3–1 to FC Porto, who completed a double. He was then replaced by Tozé Marreco.

Managerial statistics

References

External links
Nuno Campos at ForaDeJogo
Nuno Campos managerial stats at ForaDeJogo

1975 births
Living people
Footballers from Lisbon
Portuguese footballers
Association football midfielders
C.F. Os Belenenses players
C.D. Olivais e Moscavide players
Atlético Clube de Portugal players
S.C. Campomaiorense players
S.C. Farense players
Vitória F.C. players
C.F. União players
Amora F.C. players
Portuguese football managers
FC Shakhtar Donetsk non-playing staff
A.S. Roma non-playing staff
Primeira Liga managers
C.D. Santa Clara managers
C.D. Tondela managers
Portuguese expatriate sportspeople in Ukraine
Portuguese expatriate sportspeople in Italy